The Portrait of a Man is a painting by the Italian Renaissance artist Luca Signorelli, dated to c. 1492 and housed in the Gemäldegalerie, Berlin.

History
In 1490–1492 Signorelli was in Volterra, a city under Florentine control, under the patronage of the House of Medici. Here he painted an Annunciation, a Virgin Enthroned with Saints, a Circumcision of Christ and, perhaps, this painting, attributed to that period for its stylistic resemblance with those works.

Description
The painting portrays an aged man from three-quarters, characterized by white hair and rich bourgeois garments, perhaps those of  a jurist, including a red beret and jacket, and a black scarf. The style is inspired to the works of Hans Memling and to some by Domenico Ghirlandaio.

The background houses Roman ruins and some naked men, inspired to those in Piero della Francesca's Death of Adam in San Francesco at Arezzo, and are also in other works by Signorelli, such as the Madonna with Child and Naked Men of the Uffizi.

Sources

1490s paintings
Paintings by Luca Signorelli
Paintings in the Gemäldegalerie, Berlin
15th-century portraits